The 1996 season was the 84th year of competitive season in the United States. It was the first season of the present top division of American soccer, Major League Soccer.

National teams

Men's

Senior

Friendlies

1996 CONCACAF Gold Cup

Group C

Knockout stage

1998 FIFA World Cup qualification

CONCACAF Third round

1996 U.S. Cup

Goalscorers

U–23

Summer Olympics

Group A

U–20

1996 CONCACAF U-20 Tournament

Group 2

Championship group

U–17

1996 CONCACAF U-17 Championship

Group A

Final Round

League Tables

Major League Soccer

A-League 

 Win = 3 points
 Shootout win (SW) = 1 point
 Loss = 0 points

U.S. Open Cup

Bracket

Final

American clubs in international competitions

Seattle Sounders

References 
 American competitions at RSSSF
 American national team matches at RSSSF
 CONCACAF Champions' Cup at RSSSF

 
1996